Acrolophus popeanella (Clemens' grass tubeworm moth) is a moth of the family Acrolophidae. It is found in the eastern United States, from New Jersey and Ohio south to Florida and west to Illinois, Nebraska and Texas.

The larvae feed on the roots of Trifolium pratense.

References

Moths described in 1859
popeanella